The Italian Institute of Human Sciences (SUM) (in Italian: Istituto Italiano di Scienze Umane) is an Italian public university  dedicated to post-graduate formation and high level research in human and social sciences. It promotes Doctoral, Post-Doctoral and Master programmes in collaboration with other Italian and European universities.

It is constituted by five schools and institutes within the universities of Florence, Bologna, Rome - La Sapienza, Milan - Bicocca, Siena, Naples - Federico II, Naples - Eastern and Naples - Suor Orsola Benincasa.

In association with the Central European University (CEU), the École des Hautes Études en Sciences Sociales (EHESS), the École Pratique des Hautes Études (EPHE), and the Humboldt Universität in Berlin, it has established the European Doctoral School for the Human and Social Sciences.

It has cooperation and co-tutorship agreements with the École des Hautes Études en Sciences Sociales, the École Pratique des Hautes Études, the New York University and the Georgetown University.

Schools

Istituto di Studi Umanistici, University of Florence
Scuola Superiore di Studi Umanistici, University of Bologna
 Scuola Superiore di Studi Umanistici, University of Siena 
Scuola di Alta Formazione nelle Scienze Umane e Sociali, University of Naples Federico II and Naples Eastern University 
Scuola Europea di Studi Avanzati, University of Naples - Suor Orsola Benincasa.
European Doctoral School for the Human and Social Sciences, in association with the Central European University (CEU), the École des Hautes Études en Sciences Sociales (EHESS),the École Pratique des Hautes Études (EPHE) and the Humboldt Universität (HU).

PhD Programmes

Political Science 
History of Ideas, Philosophy and Science
Ethics and History of Philosophy
Anthropology, History and Philosophy of Culture
Law and Economy
Theoretical and Political Philosophy
Philology, history of the Italian language and literature
Juridical Science and Theory of the Law
Philosophy of History
European literature and culture
Semiotics
Europe and the invention of modernity
Studies over the visible representation: history, theory and production of arts and images 
Sociology
History of the International Relations
Contemporary History 
Ancient, Medieval and Enlightenment Studies
Modern and Contemporary Philosophy 
Geopolitics and culture of the Mediterrean
 Linguistics and history of the linguistic thought
 Contemporary History and Society
Universalization of the juridical systems: history and theory

European PhD programmes

History

curricula: 
Europe and the invention of modernity
Comparative history of knowledge
The Classic tradition and its mediations in the Christian, Jewish and Muslim worlds
Social Science

curricula: 
Europe in the context of globalization
The social and political bases of Europe
The social sciences of religions

2002 establishments in Italy
Educational institutions established in 2002
Higher education in Italy